The 1878 West Kent by-election was fought on 15 May 1878.  The by-election was fought due to the resignation in order to contest Oxford University of the incumbent Conservative MP, John Gilbert Talbot.  It was won by the unopposed Conservative candidate Viscount Lewisham.

References

1878 in England
1878 elections in the United Kingdom
By-elections to the Parliament of the United Kingdom in Kent constituencies
19th century in Kent
Unopposed by-elections to the Parliament of the United Kingdom in English constituencies